Mariano Salvador Maella Pérez (21 August 1739 – 10 May 1819) was a Spanish painter known primarily for his portraits and religious frescoes. He was appointed chamber painter of King Charles IV of Spain in 1774 and became well known for his portraits.

Biography 
Maella was born in Valencia. His artistic education began with his father, who was also a painter. In 1752, at the age of eleven, he moved to Madrid and received lessons from Felipe de Castro, a sculptor who helped introduce the Neoclassical style to Spain. This was followed by enrollment at the Real Academia de Bellas Artes de San Fernando, where he attracted the attention of Antonio González Velázquez (whose daughter he would later marry).

In 1757, with the money from three prizes awarded by the Academia and the support of his family, he was able to study in Rome. He returned to Spain in 1765 and participated in the remodeling of the Palacio Real de Madrid under the direction of Anton Raphael Mengs, who had a significant influence on his style. In 1772, he created illustrations for a new edition of works by Francisco de Quevedo.

His career in Madrid began in earnest when he was appointed a court painter in 1774 and became well known for his portraits. He not only worked at the Palacio Real, but at La Granja de San Ildefonso, the Palacio de El Pardo and the Palacio de El Escorial as well. In addition, he restored works by Juan de Borgoña at the Cathedral of Toledo, painted frescoes at Burgo de Osma Cathedral and created designs for the Royal Tapestry Factory; where he also served as a supervisor for the new artists. From 1795 to 1798, following the death of Francisco Bayeu, he served as Director General of the Academia.

In 1799, he and Francisco Goya were named as primary court painters and he began to work on the restoration of several Royal sites. After the fall of King Carlos IV in 1808, he did not hesitate to switch his allegiance to the new French government of King José I and received the King's hospitality in return. This eventually led to the end of his career. When King Fernando VII took the throne, Maella was accused of being afrancesado, dismissed from the court, and retired with only a fifth of his salary, to be replaced by Vicente López Portaña, one of his students. He died, aged 79, in Madrid.

Selected paintings

References

Further reading
 José Manuel de la Mano, Mariano Salvador Maella, 1739-1819: dibujos : catálogo razonado, Fundación Botín, 2011, 2 vols. 
 José Luis Morales y Marín, Mariano Salvador Maella: vida y obra, Moncayo, 1996

External links 

More works by Maella @ the Biblioteca Digital Hispánica
"Mariano Salvador Maella en el reinado de Carlos IV. Apuntes Biográficos" by José Luis Morales y Marín from the Boletín de la Real Academia de Bellas Artes de San Fernando #69, 1989, digitalized @ the Biblioteca Virtual Miguel de Cervantes
"Mariano Salvador Maella" scholarly articles both in web and PDF @ the Spanish Old Masters Gallery

1739 births
1819 deaths
People from Valencia
Painters from the Valencian Community
18th-century Spanish painters
18th-century Spanish male artists
Spanish male painters
19th-century Spanish painters
19th-century Spanish male artists
Court painters
Spanish portrait painters
Fresco painters
Tapestry artists
Real Academia de Bellas Artes de San Fernando alumni
Spanish textile artists